Petals Around the Rose is a mathematically challenging puzzle in which the object is to work out the formula by which a number is derived from the roll of a set of five or six dice. It is often used as an exercise in inductive reasoning. The puzzle became popular in computer circles in the mid 1970s, particularly through an anecdote recounted in Personal Computing which depicts Bill Gates working out the solution in an airport.

Puzzle play
The puzzle is commonly presented as a challenge in which one person (the presenter), familiar with the puzzle's set formula, rolls the dice and announces the calculated result for their roll, repeating ad nauseam. Players are challenged to work out the formula being used by the presenter and to verbally announce the calculated result of each roll along with the presenter. It is intended that they keep the formula to themselves.

The formula
The key to the formula is given by the name of the puzzle, and the presenter should state the name of the challenge distinctly. The calculated (announced) result for a throw is calculated by counting only the "petals around the rose", where a "rose" is any die face with a center dot.  On a standard 6-sided die, this corresponds to the three odd faces—1, 3, and 5. The rose's "petals" are the dots which surround the center dot.  There is no rose on the 2, 4, or 6 faces, so these count as zero.  There are no petals on the 1 face, so it also counts as zero.  There are two petals and four petals on the 3 and 5 faces, respectively. Thus, the solution to a given throw can be found by:

 Adding the total petals, or;
 Starting with 2 times the number of dice that land on the 3 face and adding to it 4 times the number of dice that lands on the 5 face.

For example, in a roll of 1-2-3-4-5-6, there is one 3 and one 5 face, so the result is two plus four, or six.

References

Logic puzzles
Dice games